The Paria whitestart (Myioborus pariae), also known as the Paria redstart, yellow-faced whitestart or yellow-faced redstart, is a species of bird in the family Parulidae. It is endemic to the Paria Peninsula in Venezuela, where it occurs in humid forests, especially near the edge. It is threatened by on-going habitat loss within its tiny range.

References

Myioborus
Birds of Venezuela
Taxonomy articles created by Polbot